Annales Laurissenses, meaning "annals of Lorsch", may refer to either of two sets of Reichsannalen associated with the Abbey of Lorsch:

Annales Laurissenses minores (lesser annals of Lorsch), covering the years 680–817 and written at Lorsch
Annales Laurissenses maiores (greater annals of Lorsch), covering the years 741–801 and discovered at Lorsch

See also
The Annales Laureshamenses (also meaning "annals of Lorsch"), a distinct set of annals based on a text originally composed at Lorsch (but not discovered there), covering the years 703–803
The Annales laureshamenses antiquiores covering the years 768–90, but not composed at Lorsch